Ashantilly was built by 1820 by Thomas Spalding (1774–1851), north of Darien, Georgia. The construction probably took 2 or 3 years.  The house is made out of tabby and is also called Old Tabby.  The house was named after Ashintully Castle, an ancestral home in Perthshire, Scotland.

Spalding was a businessman in Darien and inherited property from his mother, Margery McIntosh. He was the owner of the Sapelo Island Plantation.

The Wilcox family bought Ashantilly in 1870 and they made several changes to the house, removing classical columns and marble flagging.  The Haynes family moved to the house in 1918.  In 1937 the house was gutted by a fire.  Restoration of the house started in 1939, using period pieces salvaged in Savannah and Charleston.  William Greaner Haynes, Jr. (1908–2001), in 1954, started a private press, the Ashantilly Press, and a building for printing was built on the property.  The family donated the property to the Ashantilly Center (a non-profit organization) in 1993.

Ashantilly was added to the National Register of Historic Places on August 25, 2015.

References

External links
 
 Ashantilly Center website 
 

McIntosh County, Georgia
Houses on the National Register of Historic Places in Georgia (U.S. state)
National Register of Historic Places in McIntosh County, Georgia